Marzpetuni was a family and region of the old Armenia.

Their main rulers were Georg Marzpetuni (c. 950) and Gor or Kor Marzpetuni (c. 970).

References

See also
List of regions of old Armenia

Early medieval Armenian regions